California State University, Stanislaus (Stanislaus State, Stan State) is a public university in Turlock, Stanislaus County, California.  It is part of the California State University system. It was established in 1957 and offers 45 bachelor's degree programs, 17 master's degree programs, one doctoral degree (Doctor of Education), and 6 teaching credentials. Stanislaus State is a Hispanic-serving institution.

History
In 1957, the California State Legislature established what was then called Stanislaus State College as the 15th campus of the CSU system. Because Turlock was better known at the time for its turkeys than its aspirations towards higher education, Clark Kerr highlighted this event in his memoirs as an example of how the state colleges had become vulnerable to pork barrel politics in the state legislature. This was one of several reasons behind the creation of the California Master Plan for Higher Education of 1960.

Classes began on the Stanislaus County Fairgrounds in September, 1960, and the college moved to its current location five years later. The college was first accredited in 1964. It gained university status and its current name in 1986.

In 1974, the university established an extension program at the campus of San Joaquin Delta College in Stockton in neighboring San Joaquin County. In 1998 the Stanislaus State-Stockton Center expanded and moved to its own permanent campus in downtown Stockton.

Sarah Palin's selection as the keynote speaker at Stanislaus State's main fundraising event in 2010 resulted in the most successful fundraiser in the campus's history. It provoked speculation and debate when the university refused to disclose her speaking fee and certified public accountants representing Clendenin Bird & Company from Modesto, California were called in to do an internal audit regarding the investigation. The event was organized by a school foundation.

Academics

Fall freshman statisticsCSU APPLICATIONS AND ADMISSIONS REPORTS, FALL 2012http://www.csustan.edu/ir/documents/c3t2.ftfresh.college_sat_001.pdf CSU APPLICATIONS AND ADMISSIONS REPORTS, FALL 2013

California State University, Stanislaus offers 45 undergraduate programs, 17 master's degree programs and 2 graduate certificate programs, 6 school credential programs and a doctoral degree program in Educational Leadership. Its academic disciplines are clustered within four colleges:
College of the Arts, Humanities and Social Sciences
College of Business Administration
College of Education, Kinesiology and Social Work
College of Science

Several individual programs, across the four colleges, have achieved and maintain accreditation by professional accreditation bodies. Stanislaus State's College of Business Administration is accredited by the AACSB. Its Human Resource Management program has the nation's top student testing success rate. In fall 2012, Stanislaus State launched an online Master of Business Administration (MBA) degree program, the first fully online AACSB-accredited MBA program offered in the state of California.

The university library building was originally named for founding president Dr. J. Burton Vasché. The library currently holds over 370,000 volumes, 841 print journal subscriptions, access to 141 electronic databases, and a growing number of electronic journals, video recordings, and compact discs. The University Library also contains a Children's collection, which has more than 5,900 titles of children's literature. The library offers access to more than 70 electronic databases and also contains federal, state, and local documents.

As of fall 2017, the five most popular bachelor's degrees Programs are BS Business Administration, BA Psychology, BA Liberal Studies, BA/BS Biological Sciences, and BA Criminal Justice.

The university has several resources available for students. The Tutoring/Writing Center is located in the Vasche Library and offers individual and group tutoring. Some of the services available include essay planning, organization, development and revision, writing across the curriculum, ESL, and WPST test preparation. The university also has a bookstore that features marble herms by sculptor Andrew Wilson alongside other artwork, as well as a university police department and financial aid office. The New Stanislaus State Student Center is scheduled to open Spring 2020.

Rankings

The 2023 U.S. News & World Report Best Regional Colleges West Rankings ranked Stanislaus 4 on Top Performers on Social Mobility, 9 on Top Public Schools, 12 on for best Colleges for Veterans, and 293 in Nursing (tie).

The 2022 U.S. News & World Report Best Regional Colleges West Rankings ranked Stanislaus 6 on Top Performers on Social Mobility, 12 on Top Public Schools, 14 on for best Colleges for Veterans, and 332 in Nursing (tie).

In 2020, Cal State Stanislaus was ranked 1st by Washington Monthly for "Best Bang for the Buck" out of 215 schools in the U.S. western region.

Athletics

Stanislaus State, in the Division II of the NCAA, competes in the California Collegiate Athletic Association (CCAA). Stanislaus State fields 14 sports for men and women for the fall, winter, and spring seasons. Fall sports for men include soccer and cross country. Fall sports for women are soccer, volleyball and cross country. The winter sport for men is basketball and for women it is basketball and indoor track and field. Spring sports for men include baseball, golf, and track and field. Spring sports for women include softball, track and field, and tennis. Stan State also sponsors a competitive cheer team, which has competed at the NCA National Championships since 2017. Besides both being located in the east of California, but one in the south and the other in the north, Stanisaus and San Bernardino have competed heavily as conference rivals.

Ed & Bertha Fitzpatrick Arena
Ed & Bertha Fitzpatrick Arena (aka Warrior Gym) is a 2,000-seat multi-purpose, built in 1978, which is the home arena for the university's Warriors basketball and volleyball teams. It was also briefly the home of the defunct Big Valley Shockwave of the American Basketball Association. In the 2010–2011 season the name of the basketball arena was changed to Ed & Bertha Fitzpatrick Arena.

Student life

The university has a Hmong Students Association. In 2004 the association and a former member led the Project Ready for School to help children arriving in the United States from a Thai refugee camp for preparing for school.

As of fall 2018 CSU Stanislaus had the third largest enrollment percentage of Mexican Americans in the California State University system.

Greek life – sororities and fraternities 
Greek life at CSUS includes:

Notable people

Alumni

 Susan Eggman – Currently serving in the California State Senate
 Nancy Stoyer - Scientist who assisted in the discovery of 5 elements
 Steve Andrade – Major League Baseball pitcher for the Kansas City Royals
 Gregorio Billikopf – professor and author
 Dennis Cardoza – U.S. Representative for California's 18th congressional district
 Gary Condit (B.A., 1972) – former Congressman from California, initially implicated in the Chandra Levy murder case, before being cleared
 Leo Dottavio – Reality television personality, actor, and comedian, known for his performance on The Bachelorette Season 14
 Carrie Henn – Child actress who starred in Aliens
 Rusty Kuntz – former Major League Baseball outfielder and 1984 World Series Champion; current Kansas City first base coach
 Rico Oller (1980) – former California State Senator
 Jasmine Sandlas – Indian-American playback singer, television personality, performer, and songwriter
 Joe Ryan (baseball) - Baseball pitcher for the Minnesota Twins
 Robert J. Ulrich (casting director) - Emmy Award-winning casting director, producer and former host of the show The Glee Project
 Kim Johnston Ulrich - Actor who starred in shows including As the World Turns and Passions

Faculty
 As'ad AbuKhalil – Professor of Political Science
 Richard Weikart – Professor Emeritus of History, fellow at the Discovery Institute

Notes

References

External links

Cal State Stanislaus Athletics website

 
Stanislaus
California State University, Stanislaus
Turlock, California
Universities and colleges in Stanislaus County, California
Schools accredited by the Western Association of Schools and Colleges
San Joaquin Valley
Educational institutions established in 1957
1957 establishments in California